Calvary Schools of Holland (CSH) is a private Christian school located in Holland, Michigan. Calvary Schools educates students ranging in age from junior kindergarten to 12th grade at 2 locations. Calvary Schools employs a model of education based on English educator Charlotte Mason.  Calvary Schools is a member school of Ambleside Schools International. Calvary Schools is accredited by Accreditation International, the National Council for Private School Accreditation, and the Association of Christian Schools International.

Academics
Calvary Schools became a member of Ambleside Schools International in 2015, which supports and trains schools in the philosophy of English educator Charlotte Mason.

Campuses 
Calvary Schools consists of two campuses. Lower and elementary school are housed at Plasman campus. Middle and high school are housed on 40 acres at Laketown campus.

Officials
The current Executive Director/Head of School is Cheryl Ward.

References

External links
 Official Website

Private elementary schools in Michigan
Private middle schools in Michigan
Private high schools in Michigan
Buildings and structures in Holland, Michigan
Schools in Ottawa County, Michigan
Education in Allegan County, Michigan